Broadcast quality is a term stemming from quad videotape to denote the quality achieved by professional video cameras and time base correctors (TBC) used for broadcast television, usually in standard definition. As the standards for commercial television broadcasts have changed from analog television using analog video to digital television using digital video, the term has generally fallen out of use.

Manufacturers have used it to describe both professional and "prosumer" or "semi-professional" devices. A camera with the minimum requirements typically being the inclusion of three CCDs and relatively low-compression analog recording or digital recording capability with little or no chroma subsampling, and the ability to be genlocked. The advantages of three CCDs include better color definition in shadows, better overall low-light sensitivity, and reduced noise when compared to single-CCD systems.  With continuing improvements in image sensors, resolution, recording media, and codecs, by 2006 the term no longer carried much weight in the marketplace.

The term is also used in its literal sense in broadcasting jargon in judging the fitness of audio or video for broadcast.

See also
Audiophile
Videophile

References

Film and video technology
Television terminology